Eynhallow is a small, presently uninhabited island, part of Orkney, off the north coast of mainland Scotland.

Geography

Eynhallow lies in Eynhallow Sound between Mainland, Orkney and Rousay.
Sheep Skerry adjoins the southern end of the island.

There is no ferry to the island, although Orkney Heritage Society organises a trip each July. Otherwise, visitors have to arrange their own transport to the island by private local boat hire. Access can be problematic, as there are strong tidal surges in the surrounding strait, squeezed between Mainland of Orkney and Rousay.

History

The island's main attraction is Eynhallow Church dating from the twelfth century or earlier, and perhaps originally part of a monastery. The site is maintained by Historic Scotland.

In 1841 the island had a population of 26. It has been uninhabited since the landowner cleared crofters away in 1851.  The clearing led to the discovery of the church ruins, forgotten until then.  It is now a bird sanctuary.

It has its own folklore, concerning the initial finding of the island. Eynhallow was believed to be the summer residence of the shape-shifting mer-people the Finfolk, who were driven away by the farmer, Guidman o' Thorodale from Evie.

See also
Gurness

Notes

References

External links

Photographs of the island

Sites of Special Scientific Interest in Orkney
Uninhabited islands of Orkney
Former populated places in Scotland
Bird sanctuaries